Elattoneura pasquinii is a species of damselfly in the family Platycnemididae. It is endemic to Ethiopia. It is known from only three sites along streams and rivers.

References

Platycnemididae
Insects of Ethiopia
Endemic fauna of Ethiopia
Insects described in 1978
Taxonomy articles created by Polbot